The year 2010 is the eighth year in the history of Jungle Fight, a mixed martial arts promotion based in Brazil. In 2010 Jungle Fight held 8 events beginning with, Jungle Fight 17: Vila Velha.

Events list

Jungle Fight 17: Vila Velha

Jungle Fight 17: Vila Velha was an event held on February 27, 2010 at Costa Beach in Vila Velha, Brazil.

Results

Jungle Fight 18: São Paulo

Jungle Fight 18: São Paulo was an event held on March 20, 2010 at The Pacaembu Gymnasium in São Paulo, Brazil.

Results

Jungle Fight 19: Warriors 3

Jungle Fight 19: Warriors 3 was an event held on April 17, 2010 at The Mané Garrincha Stadium in São Paulo, Brazil.

Results

Jungle Fight 20

Jungle Fight 20 was an event held on May 22, 2010 at The Pacaembu Gymnasium in São Paulo, Brazil.

Results

Jungle Fight 21

Jungle Fight 21 was an event held on July 31, 2010 at The Nélio Dias Gymnasium in Natal, Brazil.

Results

Jungle Fight 22

Jungle Fight 22 was an event held on September 18, 2010 at The Ibirapuera Gymnasium in São Paulo, Brazil.

Results

Jungle Fight 23

Jungle Fight 23 was an event held on October 30, 2010 at The Pará State University Gymnasium in Belém, Brazil.

Results

Jungle Fight 24

Jungle Fight 24 was an event held on December 18, 2010 at The Flamengo Rowing Club Gymnasium in Rio de Janeiro, Brazil.

Results

See also 
 Jungle Fight

References

2010 in mixed martial arts
Jungle Fight events